Aistė is a Lithuanian feminine given name.

People bearing the name Aistė include:
 Aistė Smilgevičiūtė, a Lithuanian singer
 Aistė Diržiūtė, a Lithuanian actress
 Aistė Pilvelytė, a Lithuanian singer
 Aistė Gedvilienė, a Lithuanian politician

References

Lithuanian feminine given names